Brad Dolley (born 7 July 1992) is a South African cricketer. He was included in the Eastern Province cricket team squad for the 2015 Africa T20 Cup.

He was the leading wicket-taker in the 2017–18 CSA Provincial One-Day Challenge tournament for Eastern Province, with 12 dismissals in eight matches.

References

External links
 

1992 births
Living people
South African cricketers
Eastern Province cricketers
Cricketers from Port Elizabeth
Warriors cricketers